Zhang Jizhong (born May 23, 1951) is a Chinese film producer, director, teacher, and writer. He is known as one of the more prominent television producers in China. His best known productions include the CCTV adaptations of the Four Great Classical Novels of Chinese literature, namely Romance of the Three Kingdoms and The Water Margin, as well as adaptations of Louis Cha's wuxia novels. He is also known for building large film cities with the support of local government authorities, sets that have later been developed into tourist attractions.

Zhang's adaptations of Louis Cha's works are somewhat controversial in China. Reception to these productions are generally mixed as some feel his productions are largely overblown, muddled and bombastic, while others champion his large budget and use of scenic locations.

Early life
In Zhang's early life, he and his seven siblings endured many hardships because his father served as a county head for the Kuomintang. In the sixth grade, with the encouragement of one of his school teachers, he applied for the PLA School of Fine Arts, but was rejected after a background check on his father's political status, even though he passed the exams. Before 1972, he also applied to China's Central Academy of Drama and other schools, but his application was still rejected after a political check, despite passing the entrance requirements. During the Cultural Revolution, Zhang was sent to work in the countryside as part of the Down to the Countryside Movement, where he worked in a coal mining town in Shanxi for six years. In 1974, Zhang became a teacher in a coal mining town in Shanxi and taught history, Chinese and biology. He also led a literature and art performing troupe that consisted of coal workers and assumed the roles of director, screenwriter and composer.

Career

Early career
After the collapse of the Gang of Four and at the time of the post-1978 economic reform in China, Zhang entered Shanxi's modern drama theater to become a stage actor. In 1979, a friend took him to a film set at the Shanghai Film Group Corporation, where he was discovered and later cast for the main role One Day When We Were Young, a television drama. In 1983, Zhang met Zhang Shaolin on set, who would become his long-term working partner. Zhang Jizhong and Zhang Shaolin's first television production as producer and director respectively, One Hundred Years of Suffering, won the Five One Award. Some of their other works, including Vice Squad General, The People's Policeman, and Good Man Yan Juqian, all won Flying Goddess awards, one of China's awards for television production.

Romance of the Three Kingdoms and The Water Margin
Romance of the Three Kingdoms, one of the Four Great Classical Novels of Chinese literature, was the first work Zhang did as a producer for China Central Television (CCTV). When Zhang Jizhong and Zhang Shaolin discovered that CCTV was auditioning producers and directors for the series, they went to Beijing to audition, only to discover that the roles of the five production teams were all taken. Unwilling to settle for a smaller role in Beijing, the Zhangs returned to Xiamen to continue working on their own television projects. One month later, Zhang received a note from CCTV saying that changes had been made to the production team, and there was an open position to film the fourth part of the show. Zhang accepted and went on to produce 13 of the 84 episodes for the series, when he had endure over 10,000 kilometers of travel in 11 months in the remote areas of Yunnan, Qinghai, Tibet and Inner Mongolia, as well as battle scenes involving thousands of extras and hundreds of horses. Two large film cities were built for the series in Hebei (33,000 m²) and Wuxi (3,000 m²), and have since become tourist attractions. The series enjoyed successful reviews in mainland China and distribution rights to the show were sold to Japan, Hong Kong, Thailand, Taiwan and Malaysia.

Following the success of Romance of the Three Kingdoms, the Zhangs were asked to produce The Water Margin, another one of the Four Great Classical Novels of Chinese literature. Zhang Jizhong and Zhang Shaolin were appointed as head producer and director respectively, and had full responsibility for the series. Martial arts were an important aspect of the production process for The Water Margin, and Zhang worked with choreographer Yuen Woo-ping. After three years and eight months of production, The Water Margin was broadcast on CCTV with high viewership and was the recipient of many Flying Goddess awards and made a profit of 100 million yuan for CCTV.

Adaptations of wuxia novels
After the success of Romance of the Three Kingdoms and The Water Margin, Zhang was appointed a permanent position at CCTV. In 1999, Hong Kong writer Louis Cha told a mainland Chinese newspaper that if CCTV treated an adaptation of one of his novels as seriously as with Romance of the Three Kingdoms and The Water Margin, he would only charge one yuan for the rights. Zhang faxed Cha a reply and the next day, Cha gave Zhang the permission to choose one from his 14 novels. Zhang bought a frame, carved some patterns on it, inserted a one yuan note and gave it to Cha, who was pleased by the gift and the two have collaborated since then.

Zhang has produced several television series based on Louis Cha's wuxia novels from 2000 to 2006. Laughing in the Wind was the first mainland Chinese adaptation of Cha's The Smiling, Proud Wanderer. The series received mixed reviews because of Zhang's changes to the original story but it still received a very high 19% audience rating. Zhang's second production, The Legend of the Condor Heroes, broadcast in 2003, has been broadcast in Japan since 2005. Demi-Gods and Semi-Devils was broadcast in 2003. The series helped propel Hu Jun and Liu Yifei to fame, who moved on to star in films such as Red Cliff and The Forbidden Kingdom. Backed by Louis Cha, Liu Yifei returned to star in Return of the Condor Heroes. The series also starred and launched the career of Huang Xiaoming. The series received record high ratings when it was first broadcast on the Japanese NECO television station.

Besides producing wuxia television series, Zhang has also produced dramas including Farmer Labourer, which exposed the reality of farmer labourer problems at the time and Days of Passion and Spirit, which depicted military life. In 2008, Zhang and Huayi Brothers produced Bing Sheng, a historical television series based on the life of Sun Tzu, author of The Art of War.

Journey to the West
Zhang is in the pre-production phase of his film adaptation of Journey to the West, another one of the Four Great Classical Novels, with the story focusing on Sun Wukong, a household name in China and in other Asian countries like Japan and South Korea. He has hired Neil Gaiman as a screenwriter and the two were introduced to each other by James Cameron, who turned down the role as director, but has agreed to help with the special effects of the film. Each of the three films in the trilogy is expected to have a budget of $100 million, which would make them the most expensive films made in Chinese history. John Woo's Red Cliff budgeted roughly $80 million and currently holds the record for the Chinese film with the highest budget. Zhang is also developing a theme park, an online game and a television series based on his company's digitized content of Sun Wukong and Journey to the West.

Recognition
In recent years, many of Zhang's works have brought in strong social and media response and considerable financial benefits. In a seminar, Zhang was referred to as the "Number One Producer in Chinese Television" by experts in Chinese television and film industry for his contributions on the landscape of film production in China from a director centered system to a producer centered system. In China, producers usually only play the roles of logistic managers and accountants, but Zhang redefined the role of a film producer in China by coordinating all the aspects of the production, bearing responsibility for screenwriting, directing, creative staff, investment, media relations, casting, social issues, and personal matters. Traditionally, most of this work was handled by the film director, but experts explain that they give him such a title because he has popularized and contributed to the producer-centered system in China. Jiang Ouli, Secretary-General of the Chinese Radio and Television Association, said that a successful producer in China must be a successful politician, artist, manager and operator and that the rise of the producer centered system in China's film industry is part of the development process, which is becoming closer to the Hollywood model.

Zhang is also known for his self-promotion, anecdotes in casting, choice of themes, screenplays and marketing operation, which have caused heated discussions among the audiences and net users and have further propelled Zhang's personal fame and have brought nationwide attention to his productions.

Zhang has also built large filming sets and villages in coordination with the development of the local tourism market, and has built 11 "film cities" in Jiangsu, Hebei, Hubei, Guangxi, Guangdong, Zhejiang and Yunnan provinces in China. By negotiating with the local governments, Zhang is able to get local governments to invest in the film cities, which after filming are used to attract revenue from tourists and develop the area. During the filming of Laughing in the Wind and The Legend of the Condor Heroes, 40 million yuan was exempted with 28 million yuan going towards the development of Peach Blossom Island, The investment by the local Zhoushan government was used for the construction of the Peach Blossom Island Arching City, roads, bridges, accommodation, and marketing. The Legend of the Condor Heroes provided promotion for the attraction and tourism for the Peach Blossom Island increased tenfold the year the show was released. In 2008, Peach Blossom Island boasted 900,000 visitors. From negotiating and attracting investment from the local government in Zhejiang, CCTV only invested 30 million yuan in Laughing in the Wind, while enjoying over 70 million yuan in revenue from advertisement and overseas distribution. The Demi-Gods and Semi-Devils film city in Dali was also a success, and cost 110 million yuan to construct, with the park covers an area of 4,500 m².

Zhang was nominated as a candidate for the 2007 Green Chinese Awards, an award ceremony run by the China Environment Culture Promotion Association (CECPA).

Filmography

Film

Television

References

External links

 Zhang Jizhong's official page on Sina.com

Film directors from Shandong
Chinese film producers
1951 births
Living people
Male actors from Yantai
Chinese male stage actors
Chinese television producers
Chinese male television actors
Chinese male film actors